Valgiurata, also known as Le Tane, is a small village (curazia) located in San Marino. It belongs to the municipality (castello) of Serravalle.

History

The name, literary meaning oath valley, derives from a popular legend regarding the daughter of a country gentleman who suicided in the tower of the local castle. She was locked in the tower by her father, due to his disagreement to the love feelings of the girl for a soldier. She screamed day and night and, before dying she made an oath to search his lover in all the valley. The legend says that it is possible to hear, still today, the girl's voice in the castle.

Geography
The little village is located in the southern suburb of Serravalle, on the same-named road linking it to Torraccia, Fiorina and Domagnano.

Main sights
The castle and the tower of Valgiurata was completely restored by an American surveyor, that replaced the old decaying structure.

See also
Serravalle
Cà Ragni
Cinque Vie
Dogana
Falciano
Lesignano
Ponte Mellini
Rovereta

References

Curazie in San Marino
Serravalle (San Marino)